Eranellur  is a village in Thrissur district in the state of Kerala, India.

Demographics
 India census, Eranellur had a population of 9103 with 4395 males and 4708 females.

References

Villages in Thrissur district